The Beaver Creek Bridge near Finley, North Dakota, also known as Newburgh Bridge, is a Pratt through truss bridge that was built in 1913.  It is a pinned Pratt pony truss bridge and is "the oldest documented bridge in Steele County constructed by a long-term county bridge builder, the Fargo Bridge and Iron Company. Fargo built bridges in Steele County in almost every year between 1904 and 1920."

It was listed on the National Register of Historic Places in 1997.

It is owned and maintained by Steele County.

References

Road bridges on the National Register of Historic Places in North Dakota
Bridges completed in 1913
1913 establishments in North Dakota
National Register of Historic Places in Steele County, North Dakota
Pratt truss bridges in the United States
Transportation in Steele County, North Dakota